The Mayor of Barletta is an elected politician who, along with the Barletta's City Council, is accountable for the strategic government of Barletta in Apulia, Italy. The current Mayor is Cosimo Cannito, a centre-right independent, who took office on 15 June 2018 and was re-elected for a second term in 2022.

Overview
According to the Italian Constitution, the Mayor of Barletta is member of the City Council.

The Mayor is elected by the population of Barletta, who also elects the members of the City Council, controlling the Mayor's policy guidelines and is able to enforce his resignation by a motion of no confidence. The Mayor is entitled to appoint and release the members of his government.

Since 1994 the Mayor is elected directly by Barletta's electorate: in all mayoral elections in Italy in cities with a population higher than 15,000 the voters express a direct choice for the mayor or an indirect choice voting for the party of the candidate's coalition. If no candidate receives at least 50% of votes, the top two candidates go to a second round after two weeks. The election of the City Council is based on a direct choice for the candidate with a preference vote: the candidate with the majority of the preferences is elected. The number of the seats for each party is determined proportionally.

Italian Republic (since 1946)

City Council election (1946–1994)

From 1946 to 1994, the Mayor of Barletta was elected by the City's Council.

Direct election (since 1994)
Since 1994, under provisions of new local administration law, the Mayor of Barletta is chosen by direct election.

References

Bibliography 
 

Barletta
Mayors of places in Apulia
People from Barletta
Politics of Apulia
Barletta